The following medal table is a list of National Olympic Committees (NOCs) and one non-NOC team  ranked by the number of gold medals won by their athletes during the 2016 Summer Olympics in Rio de Janeiro, from 5 to 21 August 2016.

Vietnam, Kosovo, Fiji, Singapore, Puerto Rico, Bahrain, Jordan, Tajikistan and Ivory Coast won their first Olympic gold medals (however, Bahrain retroactively was awarded a gold medal for the 2012 Summer Olympics in 2017 due to medals reallocation). They were also the first Olympic medals of any kind for Kosovo, Jordan and Fiji. Kuwaiti shooter Fehaid Al-Deehani became the first independent athlete to win a gold medal, though gold medals have been won under the Olympic flag by other entities, such as countries that competed under the flag at 1980 Summer Olympics in Moscow or the Unified Team in 1992.

The United States of America led the medal table both in number of gold medals won and in overall medals, winning 46 gold and 121 total medals respectively. Behind the United States, Great Britain were second on the medal table by golds (27) and third by overall medals (67) – their highest ranked finishes in gold since the home games of 1908 and in overall medals since 1920  – while China were third by golds (26) and second by overall medals (70). Both countries were well clear of a following group in the table that included Russia, Germany,  France and 2020 host Japan.

Athletes from 87 nations earned medals at the 2016 Summer Olympics, breaking the record of most nations winning a medal at a single edition of the Olympics. However, following reallocation due to doping sanctions, an 87th country was later awarded a medal at the 2008 Olympics, tying the record. Athletes from 59 nations earned gold medals at these games, also breaking the record for the most nations winning gold at a single games. Host country Brazil won seven gold medals, their most at any single Summer Olympics.

Medals

The design for the Olympic medals for the 2016 Summer Olympics featured the largest medals in terms of diameter of any medal presented at the Olympics. The golds are purer than any presented at all preceding Olympics. The silvers were made from recycling mirrors, solder, and X-ray plates. Much of the copper used in the bronzes came from recycling waste from the mint that minted the medals. The obverse of the medals features Nike, the Greek  goddess of victory.

Medal table

This is the table of the medal count of the 2016 Summer Olympics, based on the medal count of the International Olympic Committee (IOC). These rankings use Olympic medal table sorting. Although this information is provided by the IOC, the IOC itself does not recognize or endorse any ranking system.

The 2016 Summer Olympic program featured 28 sports with 41 disciplines, and a total of 306 events, tentatively resulting in 306 medal sets to be distributed. Athletes from 87 countries won medals, and 59 of them won at least one gold medal. Both of these categories set new records.

Two gold medals were awarded for a first-place tie in the women's 100 metre freestyle swimming event. No silver medal was awarded as a consequence.

Three silver medals were awarded for a second-place tie in the men's 100 metre butterfly swimming event. No bronze medal was awarded as a consequence.

In boxing (13 disciplines), judo (14), taekwondo (8), and wrestling (18), two bronze medals are awarded in each event (53 additional bronze medals total). Additionally, two bronze medals were awarded for a third-place tie in the women's 100 metre backstroke swimming and in the men's K-1 200 metres canoeing events. 

Nijat Rahimov of Kazakhstan originally won the gold medal in men's 77 kg weightlifting but was disqualified in March 2022 by the Court of Arbitration for Sport for doping violations. At the time, medals for the event were not reallocated, subject to a process that could extend to 2024. If the gold medal is reallocated, Lü Xiaojun stands to win his third Olympic weightlifting gold medal. The table below reflects the stripped medal but not a reallocation.

Changes in medal standings

See also

 All-time Olympic Games medal table
 2016 Summer Paralympics medal table

References

External links
 
 
 

Medal table
Summer Olympics medal tables